Faustino Cueli (born 4 January 1957) is a Spanish former racing cyclist. He finished in last place in the 1981 Tour de France.

References

External links
 

1957 births
Living people
Spanish male cyclists
Cyclists from Cantabria
People from the Besaya Valley